Spica Publishing is a British manufacturer of role-playing games supplements, actively publishing material since 2006. It publishes supplements for the science fiction Traveller.

History 
Spica Publishing was founded in Milton Keynes, England, in 2006 by John Griffiths.

References

Companies established in 2006
Companies based in Milton Keynes